Margaret Templeton Gibson (25 January 1938 – 2 August 1994) was a British historian and academic, who specialised in early medieval history, biblical exegesis, and medieval philosophy. Having studied at the University of St Andrews and the University of Oxford, she then spent her entire teaching career at the University of Liverpool (1966–1991): at the height of her career, she was Reader in Medieval History and Director of the Liverpool Centre for Medieval Studies. In retirement and through illness, she was a senior research fellow at St Peter's College, Oxford until her death in 1994 from cancer.

Selected works

References

1938 births
1994 deaths
20th-century British historians
British women historians
British medievalists
British historians of philosophy
Scholars of medieval philosophy
Historians of the British Isles
Alumni of the University of St Andrews
Alumni of the University of Oxford
Academics of the University of Liverpool
Fellows of St Peter's College, Oxford